Al Gutaina is a district of White Nile state, Sudan.

References

Districts of Sudan